Dag Bjørndalen (born 2 April 1970) is a former Norwegian biathlete. He is the older brother of Ole Einar Bjørndalen. His biggest triumph as a biathlete is the silver medal he won in the relay in the 1998 Olympics in Nagano (together with his brother Ole Einar, Halvard Hanevold and Egil Gjelland). He was also part of the team that won the team event in the 1995 World Championships.

References
 
 

1970 births
Norwegian male biathletes
Olympic biathletes of Norway
Olympic silver medalists for Norway
Biathletes at the 1998 Winter Olympics
Living people
Olympic medalists in biathlon
Biathlon World Championships medalists
Medalists at the 1998 Winter Olympics